A number of Irish annals, of which the earliest was the Chronicle of Ireland, were compiled up to and shortly after the end of the 17th century. Annals were originally a means by which monks  determined the yearly chronology of feast days. Over time, the obituaries of priests, abbots and bishops were added, along with that of notable political events. Non-Irish models include Bede's Chronica maiora, Marcellinus Comes's Chronicle of Marcellinus and the Liber pontificalis.

Chronology
The origins of annalistic compilation can be traced to the occasional recording of notes and events in blank spaces between the latercus, i.e. the 84-year Easter table adopted from Gaulish writer Sulpicius Severus (d. c. 423).

Extant

Manuscript copies of extant annals include the following:

 Annals of Boyle
 Annals of Clonmacnoise
 Annals of Connacht
 Annals of Duiske
 Annals of the Four Masters
 Annals of Inisfallen
 Annals of Lough Cé
 Annales de Monte Fernandi, a.k.a. Annals of Multyfarnham
 Annals of Roscrea
 Chronicon Scotorum
 Annals of Tigernach
 Annals of Ulster
 The Annals of Ireland by Friar John Clyn
 Annals of Dudley Loftus
 The Short Annals of Donegal
 Leabhar Oiris
 Annals of Nenagh
 Mac Carthaigh's Book
 Cogad Gáedel re Gallaib (large parts)
 Fragmentary Annals of Ireland (parts)
 Dublin Annals of Inisfallen
 The Annals of Ireland by Thady Dowling
 Short Annals of Tirconaill
 Short Annals of Leinster
 Annales Hibernie ab anno Christi 1162 usque ad annum 1370, a.k.a. Pembridge's Annals
 Annales Hiberniae, a.k.a. Grace's Annals
 Memoranda Gadelica
 Annla Gearra as Proibhinse Ard Macha, a.k.a. Short Annals of Armagh
 A Fragment of Irish Annals
 Annals from the Book of Leinster

Other sources

Others which contain annalistic material include:

 Leabhar Bhaile an Mhóta
 Lebor Glinne Dá Loch
 Lebor Leacáin
 Leabhar Uí Dhubhagáin
 Caithréim Chellacháin Chaisil
 Leabhar na nGenealach

Many of these annals have been translated and published by the School of Celtic Studies, Dublin Institute for Advanced Studies, or the Irish Texts Society. In addition, the text of many are available on the internet at the Corpus of Electronic Texts (CELT Project) hosted by the History Department of University College Cork, National University of Ireland. (See External Links below)

The famous epic political tract Cogad Gáedel re Gallaib also contains a great deal of annalistic material from the Viking Age in Ireland which is to be found in no other surviving sources. Much of this was taken from the same sources ancestral to the Annals of Inisfallen, which have come down to us both abbreviated and lacunose.

Lost annals

Annals known to have existed but which have been lost include:

 Annals of the Island of Saints
 Annals of Maolconary
 Book of Cuanu
 Book of Dub-da-leithe
 Book of the Monks
 Leabhar Airis Cloinne Fir Bhisigh
 Leabhar Airisen
 Leabhar Airisen Ghiolla Iosa Mhec Fhirbhisigh
 Synchronisms of Flann Mainstreach
 The Chronicle of Ireland

Modern annals

 Chronology of Irish History to 1976
 The Chronicle of Ireland 1992–1996

Notes

References

 The Medieval Irish Annals, Gearoid Mac Niocaill, Medieval Irish History Series, 3, Dublin, 1975
 The earliest Irish annals, Alfred P. Smyth, Proceedings of the Royal Irish Academy, # 70, 1972, pp. 1–48.
 Astronomical observations in the Irish annals and their motivation, Aidan Breen and Daniel McCarthy, Peritia 1997, pp. 1–43
 "The Chronicle of Ireland: Then and Now", Roy Flechner, Early medieval Europe 21, 2013, pp. 422–54
 The chronology of the Irish annals, Daniel P. McCarthy, PRIA 98, 1998, pp. 203–55
 The status of the pre-Patrician Irish annals, Daniel P. McCarthy, Peritia 12, 1998, pp. 98–152.
 The Historicity of the Early Irish Annals:Heritage and Content, Patrick C. Griffin, 2001.
 The chronological apparatus of the Annals of Ulster A.D. 82-1019, Daniel McCarthy, in Peritia 16, 2002, pp. 256–83
 The original compilation of the Annals of Ulster, Daniel McCarthy, in Studia Celtica 2004, pp. 69–96.
 The Annals of the Four Masters:Irish history, kingship and society in the early seventeenth century, Bernadette Cunningham, Four Courts Press, Dublin, May 2010. 
 The Irish Annals: Their Genesis, Evolution and History, Daniel McCarthy, Four Courts Press, Dublin, 2008 .

External links
 Corpus of Electronic Texts (CELT) at University College Cork
 Irish Texts Society
 Jacobi Grace, Kilkenniensis, Annales Hiberniae - in Latin with English translation by Rev. Richard Butler
 Publications of the School of Celtic Studies
 'The Chronology of the Irish Annals' by Dan Mc Carthy
 DNA vs Irish Annals by Brad Larkin

Irish chronicles
Medieval Ireland